Zhang Xu was an 8th-century Tang-dynasty Chinese calligrapher.

Zhang Xu or Chang Hsu is also the name of:

Zhang Xu (engineer) (张煦; 1913–2015), Chinese telecommunications engineer
Zhang Xu (neuroscientist) (张旭; born 1961), Chinese neuroscientist
Cho U or Zhang Xu (張栩; born 1980), Taiwanese go player
Zhang Xu (footballer)